Sulzbach or Sülzbach may refer to:

France 
Sulzbach or Soultzbach-les-Bains, small village in Alsace
Sulzbach Formation, a geologic formation

Germany

Inhabited places
Amberg-Sulzbach, a Landkreis (district) in Bavaria, Germany
Sulzbach-Rosenberg, a town in the district Amberg-Sulzbach, Bavaria
Sulzbach, Saarland, a town in the district of Saarbrücken, Saarland
Sulzbach (Saar) station, railway station
Sulzbach, Hesse, a municipality in the Main-Taunus-Kreis, Hesse
Sulzbach am Main, a municipality in the district of Miltenberg, Bavaria
Sulzbach an der Murr, a municipality in the Rems-Murr-Kreis, Baden-Württemberg
Sulzbach-Laufen, a town in the district of Schwäbisch Hall in Baden-Württemberg
Sulzbach (Billigheim), a district of Billigheim in Baden-Württemberg
Sulzbach, Birkenfeld, part of the Verbandsgemeinde Rhaunen, district of Birkenfeld, Rhineland-Palatinate
Sulzbach, Rhein-Lahn, part of the Verbandsgemeinde Nassau, Rhein-Lahn-Kreis, Rhineland-Palatinate
Herren-Sulzbach, part of the Verbandsgemeinde Lauterecken-Wolfstein, Kusel district, Rhineland-Palatinate
Kirn-Sulzbach, a district of Kirn in the district of Bad Kreuznach, Rhineland-Palatinate
Sülzbach, a district of Obersulm, Baden-Württemberg

Rivers
Sulzbach (Main), a river of Bavaria, tributary of the Main
Sulzbach (Nidda). a river of Hesse, tributary of the Nidda
Sulzbach (Rhine), a river of Baden-Württemberg, tributary of the Rhine
Sulzbach (Rott), a river of Bavaria, tributary of the Rott
Sülzbach (Sulm), a river of Baden-Württemberg, tributary of the Sulm

States
Palatinate-Sulzbach, the name of two separate states of the Holy Roman Empire
Palatinate-Sulzbach-Hilpoltstein, a state of the Holy Roman Empire

Slovenia 
 Solčava, a town in the northern Slovenia, historically known as Sulzbach

Switzerland 
Sulzbach, Appenzell Innerrhoden, part of the Oberegg District in the canton of Appenzell-Innerrhoden
Sulzbach, Glarus, a hamlet in the village of Elm in the canton of Glarus

People
Berengar II of Sulzbach (c. 1080–1125)
Gertrude of Sulzbach (c. 1110–1146), German queen
Bertha of Sulzbach (c. 1110–1159), Byzantine Empress
Matilda of Sulzbach (died 1165), Margravine of Istria
Gebhard III of Sulzbach (c. 1140–1188)
Otto Henry, Count Palatine of Sulzbach (1556–1604)
Augustus, Count Palatine of Sulzbach (1582–1632)
Johann Friedrich, Count Palatine of Sulzbach-Hilpoltstein (1587–1644)
Christian Augustus, Count Palatine of Sulzbach (1622–1708)
Hedwig of the Palatinate-Sulzbach (1650–1681)
Theodore Eustace, Count Palatine of Sulzbach (1659–1732)
Count Palatine Joseph Charles of Sulzbach (1694–1729)
Countess Palatine Ernestine of Sulzbach (1697–1775) 
John Christian, Count Palatine of Sulzbach (1700–1733)
Anne Christine of Sulzbach, Princess of Piedmont (1704–1723)
Countess Palatine Elisabeth Auguste of Sulzbach (1721–1794) 
Countess Palatine Maria Franziska of Sulzbach (1724–1794)
Jonas Sulzbach (born 1986), Brazilian model